Juan Diego Castro Fernández (born 9 June 1955 in Cartago, Costa Rica) is a Costa Rican lawyer and politician, former Grand Master of the Grand Lodge of Costa Rica. Castro is a Defense lawyer who studied Law and Criminal science at the University of Costa Rica and has a Doctorate degree in Mediation from Universidad La Salle. Castro was Minister of Public Safety between 1994 and 1997 during the presidency of José María Figueres (PLN).  He became the first cabinet member to receive a Motion of no confidence by the Legislative Assembly when he summoned police forces to fence off Parliament as a means to press for the reform of the Penal Code. Subsequently, Castro resigned as Minister of Safety and was named Minister of Justice. He unsuccessfully ran for the presidency as the nominee of the conservative-leaning National Integration Party in the 2018 Costa Rican general election. Castro has been compared unfavorably to US President Donald Trump and other right-wing antiestablishment and right-wing populist figures.

Costa Rican general election, 2018

Castro launched his unexpected presidential campaign presenting himself as a political outsider and with a strong anti-establishment and anti-corruption speech. Promising to "rule by decree" and with a very loud "hard hand" rhetoric (uncommon in Costa Rican politics as the country is famous for its political centrism), Castro has been compared with figures like Donald Trump, Marine LePen and Rodrigo Duterte, and accused of right-wing populism and far-right positions, albeit he rejects the comparisons.

Despite his unexpected lead in the polls throughout most of the campaign, his support plummeted in the final days.  Castro came in fifth place, garnering only 9.56% of the votes in the February 4th Presidential Election.  His poor performance did not qualify him for the runoff election scheduled for April 1, 2018.

After an unfriendly separation from the National Integration Party, Castro tried unsuccessfully to create a new political party, but he abandoned the process due to "logistical difficulties".

Controversies

Antisemitism
In the July 30, 2019 editorial of the newspaper La Nación, Castro was accused of anti-Semitism for comments made in one of his official videos against the owner of the media CRHoy Leonel Baruch who is Jewish, making allusions and jokes about the Holocaust and also calling him an "evil banker." Castro's words were condemned by the Costa Rican Jewish community with an official statement from the Zionist Israelite Center. Castro's statements were also condemned by Israel's ambassador to Costa Rica Amir Ofek, who described them as "miserable expressions". The heads of most of the benches in the Legislative Assembly, including National Liberation, Citizen Action, Social Christian Unity, Broad Front and Castro's former party National Integration repudiated the expressions, the two Evangelical Christian parties' benches New Republic and National Restoration refused to comment, whilst the independent deputy Erick Rodríguez Steller, who is close to Castro, defended him arguing that his comments were taken out of context.

Homophobic statement
Castro described the government of President of Costa Rica Carlos Alvarado (who is a known supporter of LGBT rights) as maricón, a derogative Spanish term for homosexuals, after Alvarado's participation in that year's Gay Parade.

Conflict with reporters and the media
On November 24, journalist Arlene Raventós, who works in the Repretel network, showed that Castro's accusations against her that she was behind an alleged campaign to discredit him, were false. "It is unfortunate to have to go out to clarify false information without real content, published in the heat of a political campaign, which should be devoted to raising ideas about the real solution to the country's problems; but when it comes to muddying a name under and without foundation, the need to clarify with the truth prevails and that is what I request".  On December 1, 2017, journalist David Delgado, who worked at La Nación and the Ministry of Justice and Peace, publicly denounced him for "persecution, mockery and harassment" in relation to coverage of a drug trafficking case.

On December 11, 2017, he announced that he would sue the University of Costa Rica because a Facebook program of several young students reported the assault on his mother, his past as a politician and criticized what qualified his "right-wing populist" tendencies.

Panama Papers
Castro was mentioned as part of the Panama Papers case by the news reports Amelia Rueda and Semanario Universidad for being lawyer for a Mossack Fonseca law firm related company, which led him to attack Rueda and her son Antonio Jiménez, as well as the media Semanario.

Trial
In 2020 Castro went to trial against University of Costa Rica student Claudia Campos as anchorwoman of the web program "Suave un Toque" (Costa Rican slang for "Wait a Minute") on accusations of slander. During trial, Castro yelled to Campos "I do not shoot you because I believe in God" causing the Judge to warn Castro for his behavior. The case was dismissed by the Judges.

References

1955 births
Government ministers of Costa Rica
Living people
National Liberation Party (Costa Rica) politicians
People from Cartago Province
Costa Rican Freemasons
Right-wing populism in North America
20th-century Costa Rican politicians